Air Vice Marshal Allan Lancelot Addison Perry-Keene,  (10 November 1898 – 16 March 1987) was a senior Royal Air Force officer who served as the first Commander-in-Chief of the Royal Pakistan Air Force from 1947 to 1949.

Military career
Perry-Keene was a pilot in the Royal Flying Corps during the First World War.

Later life
In his later years, Perry-Keene wrote an autobiography titled Reflected Glory – An Autobiography.  It was privately published in 1978.

References

Citations

Sources 

PAF s' Chief of Air Staffs
Air of Authority – A History of RAF Organisation – AVM Perry-Keene

 

1898 births
1987 deaths
Royal Flying Corps officers
Royal Air Force air marshals
Companions of the Order of the Bath
Officers of the Order of the British Empire
People from Gateshead
Royal Air Force personnel of World War II
Chiefs of Air Staff, Pakistan
Military personnel from County Durham
Pakistan Air Force air marshals
British expatriates in Pakistan